Rottenbach is a village and a former municipality in the district Saalfeld-Rudolstadt, in Thuringia, Germany. Since 31 December 2012, it is part of the town Königsee.

References

Former municipalities in Thuringia
Schwarzburg-Rudolstadt